Squash at the 2013 Asian Youth Games was held at the Nanjing Olympic Sports Centre Squash Hall, Nanjing, China from August 17 to 23, 2013.

Medalists

Medal table

Results

Boys' singles

Boys' team

Preliminary round
20–22 August

Pool A

Pool B

Knockout round

Girls' singles

Girls' team

Preliminary round
20–21 August

Pool A

Pool B

Knockout round

References

 Boys Individual Results
 Girls Individual Results
 Team Results

External links
Official Website

2013 in squash
2013 Asian Youth Games events
2013 Asian Youth Games